The freguesias (civil parishes) of Portugal are listed in by municipality according to the following format:
 concelho
 freguesias

Abrantes
 Aldeia do Mato
 Alferrarede
 Alvega
 Bemposta
 Carvalhal (Abrantes)
 Concavada
 Fontes
 Martinchel
 Mouriscas
 Pego
 Rio de Moinhos
 Rossio ao Sul do Tejo
 São Facundo
 São João
 São Miguel do Rio Torto
 São Vicente
 Souto
 Tramagal
 Vale das Mós

Águeda
Agadão
Aguada de Baixo
Aguada de Cima
Águeda
Barrô
Belazaima do Chão
Borralha
Castanheira do Vouga
Espinhel
Fermentelos
Lamas do Vouga
Macieira de Alcoba
Macinhata do Vouga
Óis da Ribeira
Préstimo
Recardães
Segadães
Travassô
Trofa
Valongo do Vouga

Aguiar da Beira
Aguiar da Beira
Carapito
Cortiçada
Coruche
Dornelas
Eirado
Forninhos
Gradiz
Pena Verde
Pinheiro
Sequeiros
Souto de Aguiar da Beira
Valverde

Alandroal
Alandroal (Nossa Senhora da Conceição)
Capelins (Santo António)
Juromenha (Nossa Senhora do Loreto)
Santiago Maior
São Brás dos Matos (Mina do Bugalho)
Terena (São Pedro)

Albergaria-a-Velha
Albergaria-a-Velha
Alquerubim
Angeja
Branca
Frossos
Ribeira de Fráguas
São João de Loure
Valmaior

Albufeira
Albufeira
Ferreiras
Guia
Olhos de Água
Paderne

Alcácer do Sal
Alcácer do Sal (Santa Maria do Castelo)
Alcácer do Sal (Santiago)
Comporta
Santa Susana
São Martinho
Torrão

Alcanena
Alcanena
Bugalhos
Espinheiro
Louriceira
Malhou
Minde
Moitas Venda
Monsanto
Serra de Santo António
Vila Moreira

Alcobaça
Alcobaça
Alfeizerão
Aljubarrota (Prazeres)
Aljubarrota (São Vicente)
Alpedriz
Bárrio
Benedita
Cela
Coz
Évora de Alcobaça
Maiorga
Martingança
Montes
Pataias
São Martinho do Porto
Turquel
Vestiaria
Vimeiro (Alcobaça)

Alcochete
Alcochete
Samouco
São Francisco

Alcoutim
Alcoutim
Giões
Martim Longo
Pereiro
Vaqueiros

Alenquer
Abrigada
Aldeia Galega da Merceana
Aldeia Gavinha
Alenquer (Santo Estêvão)
Alenquer (Triana)
Cabanas de Torres
Cadafais
Carnota
Carregado
Meca
Olhalvo
Ota
Pereiro de Palhacana
Ribafria
Ventosa
Vila Verde dos Francos

Alfândega da Fé
Agrobom
Alfândega da Fé
Cerejais
Eucisia
Ferradosa
Gebelim
Gouveia
Parada
Pombal
Saldonha
Sambade
Sendim da Ribeira
Sendim da Serra
Soeima
Vale Pereiro
Vales
Valverde
Vilar Chão
Vilarelhos
Vilares de Vilariça

Alijó
Alijó
Amieiro
Carlão
Casal de Loivos
Castedo
Cotas
Favaios
Pegarinhos
Pinhão
Pópulo
Ribalonga
Sanfins do Douro
Santa Eugénia
São Mamede de Ribatua
Vale de Mendiz
Vila Chã
Vila Verde
Vilar de Maçada
Vilarinho de Cotas

Aljezur
Aljezur
Bordeira
Odeceixe
Rogil

Aljustrel
Aljustrel
Ervidel
Messejana
Rio de Moinhos
São João de Negrilhos

Almada
Almada
Cacilhas
Caparica
Charneca de Caparica
Costa da Caparica
Cova da Piedade
Feijó
Laranjeiro
Pragal
Sobreda
Trafaria

Almeida
Ade
Aldeia Nova
Almeida
Amoreira
Azinhal
Cabreira
Castelo Bom
Castelo Mendo
Freineda
Freixo
Junça
Leomil
Malhada Sorda
Malpartida
Mesquitela
Mido
Miuzela
Monte Perobolço
Nave de Haver
Naves
Parada
Peva
Porto de Ovelha
São Pedro de Rio Seco
Senouras
Vale da Mula
Vale de Coelha
Vale Verde
Vilar Formoso

Almeirim
Almeirim
Benfica do Ribatejo
Fazendas de Almeirim
Raposa

Almodôvar
Aldeia dos Fernandes
Almodôvar
Gomes Aires
Rosário
Santa Clara-a-Nova
Santa Cruz
São Barnabé
Senhora da Graça de Padrões

Alpiarça
Alpiarça
Alter do Chão
Chancelaria
Cunheira
Seda

Alvaiázere
Almoster
Alvaiázere
Maçãs de Caminho
Maçãs de Dona Maria
Pelmá
Pussos
Rego da Murta

Alvito
Alvito
Vila Nova da Baronia

Amadora
Alfornelos
Alfragide
Brandoa
Buraca
Damaia
Falagueira
Mina
Reboleira
São Brás
Venda Nova
Venteira

Amarante
Aboadela
Aboim
Amarante (São Gonçalo)
Ansiães
Ataíde
Bustelo
Canadelo
Candemil
Carneiro
Carvalho de Rei
Cepelos
Chapa
Figueiró (Santa Cristina)
Figueiró (Santiago)
Fregim
Freixo de Baixo
Freixo de Cima
Fridão
Gatão
Gondar
Gouveia (São Simão)
Jazente
Lomba
Louredo
Lufrei
Madalena
Mancelos
Oliveira
Olo
Padronelo
Real
Rebordelo
Salvador do Monte
Sanche
Telões
Travanca
Várzea
Vila Caiz
Vila Chã do Marão
Vila Garcia

Amares
Amares
Barreiros
Besteiros
Bico
Bouro (Santa Maria)
Caires
Caldelas
Carrazedo
Dornelas
Ferreiros
Figueiredo
Fiscal
Goães
Lago
Paranhos
Paredes Secas
Portela
Prozelo
Rendufe
Sequeiros
Seramil
Torre
Vilela

Anadia
Aguim
Amoreira da Gândara
Ancas
Arcos
Avelãs de Caminho
Avelãs de Cima
Mogofores
Moita
Óis do Bairro
Paredes do Bairro
Sangalhos
São Lourenço do Bairro
Tamengos
Vila Nova de Monsarros
Vilarinho do Bairro

Angra do Heroísmo
Altares
Cinco Ribeiras
Doze Ribeiras
Feteira
Nossa Senhora da Conceição
Porto Judeu
Posto Santo
Raminho
Ribeirinha
Santa Bárbara
Santa Luzia
São Bartolomeu de Regatos
São Bento
São Mateus da Calheta
São Pedro
Sé
Serreta
Terra Chã
Vila de São Sebastião

Ansião
Alvorge
Ansião
Avelar
Chão de Couce
Lagarteira
Pousaflores
Santiago da Guarda
Torre de Vale de Todos

Arcos de Valdevez
Aboim das Choças
Aguiã
Alvora
Arcos de Valdevez (Salvador)
Arcos de Valdevez (São Paio)
Ázere
Cabana Maior
Cabreiro
Carralcova
Cendufe
Couto
Eiras
Ermelo
Extremo
Gavieira
Giela
Gondoriz
Grade
Guilhadeses
Jolda (Madalena)
Jolda (São Paio)
Loureda
Mei
Miranda
Monte Redondo
Oliveira
Paçô
Padreiro (Salvador)
Padreiro (Santa Cristina)
Padroso
Parada
Portela
Prozelo
Rio Cabrão
Rio de Moinhos
Rio Frio
Sá
Sabadim
Santar
São Cosme e São Damião
São Jorge
Senharei
Sistelo
Soajo
Souto
Tabaçô
Távora (Santa Maria)
Távora (São Vicente)
Vale
Vila Fonche
Vilela

Arganil
Anceriz
Arganil
Barril de Alva
Benfeita
Celavisa
Cepos
Cerdeira
Coja
Folques
Moura da Serra
Piódão
Pomares
Pombeiro da Beira
São Martinho da Cortiça
Sarzedo
Secarias
Teixeira
Vila Cova de Alva

Armamar
Aldeias
Aricera
Armamar
Cimbres
Coura
Folgosa
Fontelo
Goujoim
Coura
Queimadela
Santa Cruz
Santiago
Santo Adrião
São Cosmado
São Martinho das Chãs
São Romão
Tões
Vacalar
Vila Seca

Arouca
Albergaria da Serra
Alvarenga
Arouca
Burgo
Cabreiros
Canelas
Chave
Covelo de Paivó
Escariz
Espiunca
Fermedo
Janarde
Mansores
Moldes
Rossas
Santa Eulália
São Miguel do Mato
Tropeço
Urrô
Várzea

Arraiolos
Arraiolos
Gafanhoeira (São Pedro)
Igrejinha
Sabugueiro
Santa Justa
São Gregório
Vimieiro

Arronches
Assunção
Esperança
Mosteiros

Arruda dos Vinhos
Arranhó
Arruda dos Vinhos
Cardosas
Santiago dos Velhos

Aveiro
Aradas
Cacia
Eirol
Eixo
Esgueira
Glória
Nariz
Nossa Senhora de Fátima
Oliveirinha
Requeixo
Santa Joana
São Bernardo
São Jacinto
Vera Cruz

Avis
Alcôrrego
Aldeia Velha
Avis
Benavila
Ervedal
Figueira e Barros
Maranhão
Valongo

Azambuja
Alcoentre
Aveiras de Baixo
Aveiras de Cima
Azambuja
Maçussa
Manique do Intendente
Vale do Paraíso
Vila Nova da Rainha
Vila Nova de São Pedro

A

pt:Anexo:Lista de freguesias de Portugal